Boleto De Entrada, (English: Entrance Ticket) is the second studio album of Latin Grammy winner, singer-songwriter Kany García. It reached the top 10 of the album charts in both the United States Latin charts and #1 in Puerto Rico. The album was released on November 6, 2009, and produced by García and Andrés Castro, Sony BMG. On September 8, 2010, Boleto De Entrada received a nomination for the 2010 Latin Grammy Awards in the category of "Best Female Pop Vocal Album". This was García's second nomination in this category, she previously won in this category in 2008. Boleto De Entrada was nominated for a Grammy Award for Best Latin Pop Album.

Album information
After a successful year, García entered the recording studio to record her second album. García described the album as more "pop, rock and soft ballads". García collaborated with Tego Calderón on the song "El Feo". With the duet, García explained that the song is ska and rock and is based on the history of a beautiful girl who falls in love with an ugly man.

García recorded some of the songs of her second album with Latin American instruments such as the Puerto Rican cuatro and tiple. The first single, "Feliz", has more of "Latin American" style and folk style.<ref>{{Cite web|url=http://deportes.eluniversal.com/2009/07/21/music_ava_feliz-regreso-de_21A2525363.shtml|archive-url=https://web.archive.org/web/20090723004142/http://deportes.eluniversal.com/2009/07/21/music_ava_feliz-regreso-de_21A2525363.shtml|url-status=dead|archive-date=July 23, 2009|title=Feliz regreso de la cantante Kany García - Musica - EL UNIVERSAL|date=July 23, 2009}}</ref> The song was inspired by an argument that García had with a friend of hers and while visiting Latin American countries when promoting her last album Cualquier Día.

García said of the album:

Track listing

Standard Edition

Deluxe edition

* Tracks confirmed by Amazon.comBoleto De Entrada - Standard Edition

Reception

Critical response

The album "Boleto de Entrada" has received mostly positive reviews.
AllMusic review: "Garcia continues to evolve as a full-flavored artist on a record that mingles the melancholy majestic with the firestorms, the overarching pop with breezy power rock. Despite the album's title, Garcia is more a Spanish-language pop singer than a Latin popster. Although she does slip in a bolero or two, namely the comely "Esta Vida Tuya Y Mía", most of the tracks on the 2009 album reveal an artist weaned on the American Pop of the 90' from alternative soul, as she throws in everything from Indigo Girls-style folk ballads "Hasta Donde", to The Strokes-ish baroom indie-rock "Eres Tu" to new country balladry "12 de Noviembre" to Guy-level R&B seduction pieces "Cuando tu no Estas". It's an alluring and unpredictable, if heavily airbrushed, breakout."

Singles
"Feliz" is the first single from Boleto De Entrada. It was released earlier to radio stations on July 22, 2009, and as a digital download on iTunes on August 18, 2009. The song debuted on Billboard Latin Songs at #50 and on Billboard Latin Pop Airplay at #38. It reached #15 on Latin Tracks on where it became her first Top 20 on that chart and #4 on Latin Pop Airplay, being her 3rd Top 10 hit.
The second single was chosen to be "Esta Vida Tuya Y Mía" and it was released in January 2010. The song so far charted on Billboard Latin Pop Airplay at #14 becoming Kany's 4th Top 20 hit and charted at #39 on Latin Song Chart.
The third single is "Para Volver a Amar". The song was sent to radio on May 18, 2010. The song reached at #21 on US Latin Pop Charts and top 5 in Puerto Rico

North America and Puerto Rico
"Feliz"
"Esta Vida Tuya Y Mía"
"Para Volver a Amar"

Mexico and Latin America
"Feliz"
"Para Volver a Amar"

Tour
García's Boleto De Entrada Tour'' supported the album, and was presented by the "Oficina de la Procuradora de las Mujeres de Puerto Rico".

Charts

Certifications

Awards and nominations

Release history

Personnel
Vocals – Kany García
Background vocals – Kany García, Tego Calderón
Violin – Omar Velazquez
Violocello – Jose Daniel de Jesus
Bass/Guitar/Organ – Andres Castro
Electric guitar – Fernando Perdomo
Piano/Keyboards – Xarah

Production
Producer – Andres Castro
Co-producer - Kany García & Ruben Leyva
Editor - Warner Chappell
Director of artist & A&R- Paul Forat
Coordination of A&R: Mauri Stern, Jorge Fonseca, Isabel de Jesus
Recorded - The Hit Factory Studios (Miami), Studio On The Groove (Miami), ALFA Recording
Director of Strings: Jose A Garcia
Recording Engineers: Andres Saavedra, Orlando Vitto, Shafik Palis, ANdres Castro, Hector Ivan, Rosa ALFA, Gabriel Pena
Mixing by - Andres Castro
Recording assistant (La Bodega) - Juan Barbosa
Mix assistant (El Cielo Recording) - Lalo
Mastering - Mike Marsh in The Exchange (London)

References

2009 albums
Kany García albums